The 43rd congressional district of New York was a congressional district for the United States House of Representatives in New York. It was created in 1913 as a result of the 1910 Census. It was eliminated in 1963 as a result of the 1960 Census. It was last represented by Charles E. Goodell who was redistricted into the 38th District.

List of members representing the district

Election results

References 

 Congressional Biographical Directory of the United States 1774–present
 Election Statistics 1920-present Clerk of the House of Representatives
 

43
Former congressional districts of the United States
1913 establishments in New York (state)
1963 disestablishments in New York (state)
Constituencies established in 1913
Constituencies disestablished in 1963